The Jawaharlal Nehru International Stadium, also known as Kaloor Stadium, is a multi-purpose stadium in Kochi, Kerala, India. The stadium has a capacity of 41,000 spectators. For  Indian Super League matches, where Kerala Blasters FC plays its home games, it used to be restricted from 80,000 to 41,000 by FIFA. The stadium is widely touted to have hosted one of the loudest audiences for association football matches in the world.

The stadium has played host to a number of international cricket and football matches but after 2014 it didn't hold any cricket match due to ISL. The extensive grounds of the stadium serve as venue for important exhibitions, cinema events and political rallies in the city. The most innovative aspect of the stadium is its unique lighting towers of 2 kW Floodlights which when switched on fully can provide lighting levels for HD telecast. The Structure of the tower is itself one of a kind in India. Greater Cochin Development Authority leased out the Jawaharlal Nehru International stadium at Kaloor to the Kerala Cricket Association (KCA) for a period of 30 years.

The stadium acts as the home ground for teams including Kerala cricket team, Kerala Blasters FC (Indian Super League). Stadium holds the privilege of having the fifth loudest crowd (128 db) in the world, during ISL 2016 final match where Kerala Blasters played against Atletico de Kolkata.

Kochi was one of the six host cities for 2017 FIFA U-17 World Cup held in India. As of 19 August 2017, the stadium has hosted 10 ODIs.

History

Early years and football's popularity
The Kaloor Stadium was originally constructed as a cricket stadium. But considering that Kerala is one of the few regions in India where football enjoys considerable popularity it was used for football matches also. Indeed, in a match between India and Iraq in 1997, approximately 1,00,000 spectators filled up the venue, thus overcrowding it, which remains a record at this place. This was in the Nehru Cup International Football Tournament in 1997, which was the first tournament at the venue.
The stadium won several laurels for being constructed in a timely manner. The stadium was completed under the watchful eyes of late V. Joseph Thomas IPS who was the head of the Greater Cochin Development Authority. He was a huge fan of soccer from his college days at St. Thomas College, Palai and also served as the patron of the Kerala State Athletics Association. The stadium was inaugurated by then President of India Shankar Dayal Sharma in 1996. It has 1.3 kilometres in outer circle.

International cricket
After 1998, football went down and cricket took the centre-stage for many years, drawing sell-out and high money grossing games. In fact, the highest money grosser at the venue was made in a cricket ODI match between India and its arch-rival Pakistan in April 2005. The first ODI played on this ground was between India and Australia on 1 April 1998.

Kaloor stadium hosted the first match India played after Sachin Tendulkar's retirement. The pavilion was renamed as Sachin Tendulkar pavilion as an honour to him before this match between India and West Indies on 21 November 2013 which India won by 6 wickets.

The stadium underwent a massive renovation including a modern turf, an aesthetic modern roofing and a four-lane road from the south side of the stadium.

The first Indian Premier League game at the stadium was on 9 April 2011, when the Kochi Tuskers Kerala hosted the Royal Challengers Bangalore. It was the first IPL match for the Kochi Tuskers. Five of their 2011 home games were played in this stadium, and the other two were played at the Holkar Cricket Stadium, Indore. The stadium hosted the semi-final and final of the 2013 Duleep Trophy.

Return of football and the ISL

In 2011, Chirag United claimed the tenancy of the venue. However, the premier football club of India was still not able to fill up the stadium's massive capacity. Football returned to prominence at the venue after the launch of Indian Super League in 2014. The stadium is the home ground to Kerala Blasters, co-owned by Cricket legend Sachin Tendulkar, who has massive fan-following in the city. Some of the games involving the home team drew crowds in excess of 55,000 in the inaugural edition.

The first Indian Super League game at the stadium was on 6 November 2014, when the Kerala Blasters FC hosted the FC Goa. It was the first ISL match for the Kerala Blasters. The stadium had an average attendance of over 40,000 for the Indian Super League matches in 2014. The game between Kerala Blasters FC and Chennaiyin FC saw 61,323 spectators on 30 November 2014.

The stadium was the venue for 2013 Santosh Trophy finals.

In popular culture
The famous "Maro Maro" song composed by A.R. Rahman for the Tamil movie Boys directed by Shankar, climax scenes of the Tamil movie Velayudham starring Vijay, Malayalam movie Run Baby Run starring Mohanlal and many other Indian Films were shot in the stadium.

ODI matches held

Indian Premier League
The cricket stadium in Kochi was expected to serve the Chennai Super Kings or the Royal Challengers Bangalore as a home venue apart from Chennai and Bangalore for the initial IPL seasons. However both the franchises initially refused and later promised to reconsider the offer, fearing a decline in revenues. Eventually no matches of the first 3 IPL seasons were played in Kochi.

The auction for expanding the initial eight franchises to ten for the 2011 season was held on 22 March 2010. Rendezvous Sports World made the second highest bid of  15333 million, and elected to base its team in Kochi.

The first IPL match held at the stadium was between Kochi Tuskers Kerala and Royal Challengers Bangalore on 9 April 2011. The match was also Kochi Tuskers first ever IPL match.

ODI records at the venue
Batting
 Highest Total: 321/6 (50 overs) by West Indies vs. India on 8 October 2014.
 Lowest Total: 191 (48.3 overs) by India vs. Zimbabwe on 13 March 2002.
 Most Runs : Rahul Dravid (223 runs from 292 balls in 5 matches)
 Highest Score: Marlon Samuels (West Indies) 126* runs from 116 balls vs. India on 8 October 2014.
 Average 1st innings total : 273
 Average 2nd innings total : 225

Bowling
 Most Wickets : Sachin Tendulkar (10 Wickets, 33 Overs, 4 Matches)
 Best Bowling : Sachin Tendulkar 5/32 (India vs. Australia on 1 April 1998)

Highest partnerships by wicket

List of centuries

Key
 * denotes that the batsman was not out.
 Inns. denotes the number of the innings in the match.
 Balls denotes the number of balls faced in an innings.
 NR denotes that the number of balls was not recorded.
 Parentheses next to the player's score denotes his century number at Edgbaston.
 The column title Date refers to the date the match started.
 The column title Result refers to the player's team result

One Day Internationals

List of Five Wicket Hauls

Key

One Day Internationals

IPL records at venue
 Most Runs : Brendon McCullum (Kochi)
 Most Wickets : Vinay Kumar (Kochi) (6)
 Highest total in an innings : Royal Challengers Bangalore (162/4)
 Lowest total in an innings : Kochi Tuskers Kerala (74/10)
 Highest Score: Virender Sehwag (Delhi Daredevils) vs Kochi Tuskers Kerala (80 runs from 47 balls)
 Best Bowling : Ishant Sharma (5/12) vs. Kochi Tuskers Kerala
 Highest partnership : Sangakkara and Cameron White (90 runs off 69 balls)

Highest partnerships by wicket

Kerala Blasters FC 
The stadium is the official home ground for the Kerala Blasters FC in Indian Super League since 2014. Kerala Blasters had won their first ISL home match against FC Goa for 1–0 conducted on 06/11/2014.

The game between Kerala Blasters FC and Chennaiyin FC saw 61,234spectators on 30 November 2014. Kerala Blasters has the highest average attendances (47,427) for football clubs outside of Europe in domestic league matches.

In the inaugural season of Indian Super League, Kerala Blasters finished fourth in the group stages with 19 points from 14 games and qualified for Semi-final after beating Pune City FC. Kerala Blasters FC was unbeaten in six of their seven home games. 
In semi-final which happened to be the last home match of this year for Kerala Blasters FC, Kerala Blasters FC won in emphatic fashion by trouncing toppers Chennaiyin FC with scoreline 3–0. One of the goals was scored by Malayali midfielder Sushanth Mathew away from 30 yards through a curling long-ranger, shot over renowned footballers Alessandro Nesta and Mikaël Silvestre and it became a proud and memorable moment for sports fans in Kerala. The opening ceremony of Hero Indian Super League 2017/18 was hosted in the stadium.

Chirag United Club Kerala
The former I-League football team Chirag United Club Kerala (erstwhile Viva Kerala) played their home matches in the stadium for the 2011–12 I-League season.

2017 FIFA U-17 World Cup
On 5 December 2013, the FIFA Executive Committee chaired by FIFA President Joseph S. Blatter decided that host of 2017 FIFA U-17 World Cup will be India upon evaluation of bid sent by AIFF with Kochi as one of the eight possible venues. Later, Chief Minister of Kerala Mr.Oommen Chandy stated that they will soon sign a Memorandum of Understanding (MoU) with the Sports Ministry in that regard after an exclusive cabinet meet on the issue. Government has appointed senior IAS officer Mr. APM Mohammed Hanish as Nodal Officer as per Fifa's direction.

On 11 December 2014, FIFA team inspected the stadium and emphasised to improve the quality of pitch and need of bucket seats in the second tier of the stadium.  With Kochi registering an average crowd of 47,000 for ISL, the city has gathered attention from the authorities in terms of attracting crowd.

On 6 April 2015, AIFF cleared Kochi as one of the venues after receiving FIFA's technical committee report. Delhi, Mumbai, Guwahati, Goa and Kolkata are the other venues.

Kerala Strikers
The Celebrity Cricket League team Kerala Strikers played its home matches in the stadium since 2012.

Accessibility

The Jawaharlal Nehru International Stadium is located in the heart of the city. It lies beside the Banerjee Road between Kaloor and Palarivattom, a common stretch among many city bus routes. The Stadium Link Road from the southern side allows access from Thammanam and Kathrikadavu, although there is no public transport along this route.

All city buses passing through the Kaloor-Palarivattom stretch have a stop at the stadium. The JLN Stadium metro station of the Kochi Metro is situated right in front of the stadium. The presence of a prominent bus stop as well as a metro station makes it a prime location and one which can be easily accessed from any part of the city.

See also 
 Sports in Kerala
 List of stadiums in India
 V. Joseph Thomas IPS
 Kerala Cricket Association
 Greater Cochin Development Authority
 List of football stadiums in India
 List of association football stadiums by capacity
 List of Asian stadiums by capacity

References

External links 

 360-degree view of stadium

Cricket grounds in Kerala
Football venues in Kerala
Sports venues in Kochi
Chirag United Club Kerala
Indian Super League stadiums
2017 FIFA U-17 World Cup venues
Kerala Blasters FC
Tourist attractions in Kochi
Sports venues completed in 1996
1996 establishments in Kerala
Kochi Tuskers Kerala
20th-century architecture in India